Slobozhanske is an urban-type settlement in Chuhuiv Raion of Kharkiv Oblast in Ukraine. It is located in the valley of the Donets, on its left bank. Slobozhanske hosts the administration of Slobozhanske settlement hromada, one of the hromadas of Ukraine. Population: 

Until 4 February 2016 the settlement was known as Komsomolske. On that day, Verkhovna Rada adopted decision to rename Komsomolske to Slobozhanske according to the law prohibiting names of Communist origin. The settlement filed a case stating that the opinions of the inhabitants have been ignored; the court decided against the settlement and kept the new name.

Until 18 July 2020, Slobozhanske belonged to Zmiiv Raion. The raion was abolished in July 2020 as part of the administrative reform of Ukraine, which reduced the number of raions of Kharkiv Oblast to seven. The area of Zmiiv Raion was merged into Chuhuiv Raion.

Economy

Transportation
Slobozhanska railway station, close to the settlement, is on the railway connecting Kharkiv and Lyman via Izium. There is some passenger traffic.

Slobozhanske is connected by roads with Kharkiv and with Izium.

References

Urban-type settlements in Chuhuiv Raion